A publican was a public-works contractor or tax collector in ancient Rome.

Publican may also refer to:

 The owner, tenant or manager (licensee) of a pub (public house)
 The Publican, a former weekly magazine for the British pub trade
 Publicans - another name for the 12th-century religious sect the Arnoldists

See also
Pharisee and the Publican (or the Pharisee and the Tax Collector), a parable of Jesus